Frank Bartholomew Greer (February 26, 1879 – May 7, 1943) was an American rower who competed in the 1904 Summer Olympics.

Rowing career
A native of East Boston, Greer was a member of the East Boston Amateur Athletic Boat Club. He held the National Association of Amateur Oarsmen single sculls title from 1904 to 1095. On July 30, 1904, he won an Olympic gold medal in the single sculls competition with a time of 10:08.5 at the age of 25.  The final was held at Creve Coeur Lake in Maryland Heights, Missouri, where he beat out James Juvenal (silver) and Constance Titus (bronze).

After rowing
After his retirement, Greer coached at the Detroit Athletic Club and later in life became a sheriff at the Charles Street Jail in Boston.

References

External links
 
 Database Olympics profile

1879 births
1943 deaths
People from East Boston, Boston
American male rowers
Rowers at the 1904 Summer Olympics
Olympic gold medalists for the United States in rowing
Massachusetts sheriffs
Medalists at the 1904 Summer Olympics